Florencio Marin is a retired Belizean politician. A veteran member of the People's United Party, Marin served as Deputy Prime Minister under George Cadle Price as well as Deputy Leader of the Opposition.

Biography 
Marin entered politics in 1965 when the country was still known as British Honduras, winning a seat in the House of Representatives representing the Corozal District. Marin served continuously in the House until 2008 when he was succeeded by his son, Florencio Julian Marin.

A longtime deputy of Price in the PUP leadership, Marin served in several government posts under Price and later Said Musa. Marin became Deputy Leader of the Opposition and then Leader of the Opposition during the first Manuel Esquivel government after Price was unexpectedly defeated for re-election in December 1984. Price remained PUP leader during Marin's tenure as opposition leader and returned as prime minister in 1989.

After Price stepped down as PUP leader in 1996, Marin stood for election to succeed him. However, he was defeated by Musa.

After leaving office, Marin along with fellow former Belizean Rep. Jose Coye was charged with conspiracy to "misappropriate the value of 56 parcels of land in the Caribbean Shores area." However, in February 2013 the Caribbean Court of Justice dismissed the case based on lack of evidence.

References

Year of birth missing (living people)
Date of birth missing (living people)
Living people
People from Corozal District
People's United Party politicians
Government ministers of Belize
Deputy Prime Ministers of Belize
Members of the Belize House of Representatives for Corozal South East